Carice is a commune in the Vallières Arrondissement, in the Nord-Est department of Haiti. It has 10,180 inhabitants.

Communal sections 
The commune consists of two communal sections, namely:
 Bois Camelle, rural
 Rose Bonite, urban and rural, containing the town of Carice

References

Populated places in Nord-Est (department)
Communes of Haiti